The 2000–01 season was the 98th competitive season in Belgian football.

National team
Belgium began their qualifying campaign for the Football World Cup 2002.

* Belgium score given first

Key
 H = Home match
 A = Away match
 F = Friendly
 WCQ = FIFA World Cup 2002 Qualifying, Group 6
 og = own goal

Honours

See also
 Belgian First Division 2000-01
 2000 Belgian Super Cup
 Belgian Second Division
 Belgian Third Division: divisions A and B
 Belgian Promotion: divisions A, B, C and D

References
 FA website - International results

 
Seasons in Belgian football
Football
Football